Nathalie Djurberg (born 1978 in Lysekil) is a Swedish video artist who lives and works in Berlin.

Life and work 
Djurberg is best known for producing claymation short films that are faux-naïve, but graphically violent and erotic. Their main characters, as described by The New York Times, "are girls or young women engaged in various kinds of vileness: from mild deception, friendly torture and oddly benign bestiality to murder and mayhem." The films are accompanied by music by Hans Berg. She began making her own unique style of Claymation in 2001 and in 2004 she worked closely together with Berg to make narratives rich with symbolism that also often had humorous aspects to it.

Natalie Djurberg's artistic animations introduce the viewer into a world of miniaturized, disfigured, mutilated and often grotesque animals. The human beings are transformed into caricatured figures. Some of Djurberg's notable works are: New Movements in Fashion (2006), The natural Selection (2006), Turn into Me (2008), I Found Myself Alone (2008) and Hungry, Hungry Hippoes (2007).

Djurberg's works have been shown at Performa 2007, at Tate Britain  (2007), at the P.S.1 Contemporary Art Center in New York (2006) and at the Berlin Biennial of Contemporary Art (2006). They were also featured at solo shows at the Kunsthalle Wien (2007) and at Färgfabriken in Stockholm (2006). In 2008, she exhibited both installations and films at the Fondazione Prada in Milan. Djurberg was awarded the Silver Lion for a Promising New Artist at the Venice Biennale in 2009. In 2011, the Walker Art Center in Minneapolis organized and exhibited The Parade: Nathalie Djurberg with Music by Hans Berg, which traveled to the New Museum in New York (2012) and Yerba Buena Center for the Arts in San Francisco (2012–2013).

In 2012 at the new museum Djurberg’s installation included life-size sculptures of over eighty birds: pelicans, flamingos, turkeys, eagles, a dodo, and a snowy owl. These large pieces were made of wire, foam, silicone, painted fabric, and clay. The birds were depicted raising their wings, twisted their necks, and groomed each other. Many of them opened their mouths ferociously. In 2020, her "Crocodile, egg, man", created together with Berg, sold for 16,3 million SEK, a record sum for a contemporary Swedish work of art.

Nathalie Djurberg is represented by Giò Marconi and Lisson Gallery.

Education 
From 1994 to 1995, Djurberg received a Basic Art Education from the Folkuniversitetet in Göteborg. She attended the Hovedskous Art School in Göteborg from 1995 to 1997. During Djurberg’s schooling in Hovedskous she primarily focused on painting. Her painting skills are proven with the way her plasticine figures are modeled – her prowess gives her figures gestural expressionism. Djurberg received her Master's degree from Malmö Art Academy in 2002.

Selected exhibitions 

 2005 Giò Marconi, Milan
 2006 Zach Feuer Gallery in New York City
 2006 Färgfabriken|Färgfabriken - Center for Contemporary Art and Architecture, Stockholm
 2006 Maxxi Museum, Rome
 2007 Kunsthalle Wien
 2007 Kunsthalle Winterthur
 2008 Fondazione Prada, Milan
 2011 Walker Art Center, Minneapolis
 2012 CCC Strozzina, Florence

Clay animation and digital videos 
 Camels Drink Water (2007; 3:47 min.), Edition of 4, music by Hans Berg
 We are not two, we are one (2008; 5:33 min.), Edition of 4, music by Hans Berg
 Turn into me (2008; 7:10 min.), Edition of 4, music by Hans Berg

Awards 
 2009 Silver Lion of Biennale di Venezia for Experimentet
 2007 Carnegie Art Award 2007, Museum of Contemporary Art Kiasma, Helsinki

References

External links
 Nathalie Djurberg was awarded the Silver Lion  - Venice Biennale 2009 BiennaleChannel (YouTube), 2009-06-09
 Solo show at the Fondazione Prada
 Nathalie Djurberg at Frye Art Museum, 2009
 Nathalie Djurberg at artfacts.net
 Video interview with Nathalie Djurberg at Museum Boijmans Van Beuningen (ARTtube)
Nathalie Djurberg & Hans Berg in PBS art21

1978 births
Clay animators
Living people
People from Lysekil Municipality
Swedish video artists
Swedish animators
Swedish women animators
Swedish film directors
Swedish women film directors
Swedish contemporary artists